FC Matchakhela is a Georgian football club based in the town of Khelvachauri. Following the 2022 season, they gained promotion to Liga 3, the third tier of Georgian league system.

History
Matchakhela was founded оn the basis of Khelvachauri Sport School in 2011. Amiran Gogitidze, the 
first head coach, guided the club to Meore Liga, which they won with automatic promotion.

For most of the next season Matchakhela were engaged in inter-Adjarian rivalry with Dinamo Batumi for a second promotion place to Umaglesi Liga, in which eventually the latter prevailed. Overall, the 3rd place taken 2014 in Liga 2 has been the club's highest point reached in Georgian leagues. 

The team concluded the 2014/15 season comfortably in mid-table, but a year later entered a period of instability. Struggling the whole season, eventually they lost a survival battle. 

The 2016 season was transitional in all Georgian football leagues into Spring-Autumn system with a sharp reduction of clubs in each division. Matchakhela failed to remain in the third tier and thus suffered double relegation in successive seasons. Although they managed to climb back to Liga 3 the next year, in 2018 the team finished bottom of the league.  

Matchakhela spent two seasons in Regionuli Liga before they won promotion to Liga 4 for 2021. After two more years under Avtandil Kunchulia they successfully concluded their league campaign and moved back into the third tier.

Seasons

Squad
As of April 2022

 

(C)

Honours
• Pirveli Liga

 Third place (1): 2013-14, Group B

• Meore Liga

 Winners (1): 2012-13

• Liga 4

Third place (1): 2022

• Regionuli Liga (West)

Runners-up (2): 2017, 2020

Stadium
Matchakhela hosts home games at Akhalsopeli Central stadium, which has the capacity of 1,000 seats.

Name 
The name derives from Machakheli, a geographical area near the border between Georgia and Turkey.

References

External links
On Soccerway

Page on Facebook

Football clubs in Georgia (country)
2011 establishments in Georgia (country)